Allan Ferguson (born 24 July 1963 in Lanark) is a Scottish former professional goalkeeper.

Ferguson played for Hamilton for 11 seasons, making over 300 league appearances. He moved to Scottish Premier League club St Johnstone in 1998. Ferguson mainly served St Johnstone as backup to Alan Main and made only six league appearances in two seasons with the club.

He signed for Airdrie in 2000, and was part of the team when they went bust in 2002. He then played for Falkirk and was part of the side which knocked Hearts out of the Scottish Cup in 2003. That same side won the Scottish First Division the same season but were not accepted by the Scottish Premier League because their ground did not meet SPL standards. Ferguson was part of the side that was promoted to the SPL in 2005.

After one further season with Falkirk, Ferguson moved to Stranraer, where he made eight appearances in two seasons.

Honours
Airdrieonians
Scottish Challenge Cup: 2001–02

References

External links

Living people
1969 births
Sportspeople from Lanark
Association football goalkeepers
Scottish footballers
Hamilton Academical F.C. players
St Johnstone F.C. players
Airdrieonians F.C. (1878) players
Falkirk F.C. players
Stranraer F.C. players
Scottish Football League players
Scottish Premier League players
Footballers from South Lanarkshire